Jimmie Don Aycock (born November 4, 1946) is an American politician who served as a member of the Texas House of Representatives for the 54th district from 2007 to 2017.

Background 
Don Aycock earned a Bachelor of Science degree and Doctor of Veterinary Medicine from Texas A&M University. After serving as a captain in the United States Army, he returned to Texas, where he worked as a veterinarian, rancher, and businessman.

References 

1946 births
Living people
Members of the Texas House of Representatives
Place of birth missing (living people)